The Virginia Sil'hooettes are a student-run, all-female identifying a cappella group at the University of Virginia in Charlottesville, Virginia, United States. Once just the vision of four UVA students in the winter of 1988, the Sil'hooettes are now the most award-winning a cappella group at UVA. They have performed for thousands of people at  venues including the Kennedy Center, The White House, John Paul Jones Arena, Baltimore Orioles home baseball games, and Boston Red Sox home baseball games.

History
The idea for the Sil'hooettes was first conceived before winter break in 1988 by JoEllen Continue, Laura Fleury, Karen Sherman, and Melissa Schimke, but the spring semester of 1989 was the group's first official semester on grounds. At the time, there were only three other groups in existence, the Virginia Gentlemen, the Virginia Belles, and the Hullabahoos – who had had their inception less than a year before. Initially almost named "The Double-Breasted Jackets", the Sils' original uniform consisted of multi-colored double-breasted jackets (DBJs), but in the fall of 1995, the group made the switch to the current black and silver due to complaints about the objectification of its members.

The Sil'hooettes typically range between 9 and 18 members, though the exact number varies from year to year. The group holds auditions for new members every fall and occasionally in the spring. The group posts relevant information regarding auditions to their website as auditions approach.

On October 1, 2012, USA Today named the Virginia Sil'hooettes one of the Top 5 Collegiate A Cappella groups in the country.

On November 18, 2013, HerCampus named the Virginia Sil'hooettes the #1 Female Collegiate A Cappella group in the country.

On February 2, 2016, CollegeMagazine named the Virginia Sil'hooettes the #1 "Female Group Running the A Cappella World".

Concerts
Every semester, the Sil'hooettes host at least one concert performance, usually held at the University of Virginia's McLeod Hall on a Friday or Saturday evening.  The Sils' official website posts relevant information and online ticket sales as the date of the concerts approach.  Concert titles are different every semester but typically employ a pun on the word "Sil" (e.g. Natural Sil'ection, Get Sil'ly, Sil'verware Featuring the 'Forks). The Sil'hooettes invite a guest group to perform at these concerts before intermission, usually a male group from another school, and concert performances are typically followed by Sil'hooettes hosted after-parties, advertised to the audience at the show.

Every five years, the Sil'hooettes host an anniversary concert, inviting the Sil'unnae back to relive their glory years.  The Sils celebrated their 20th anniversary in April 2009 and celebrated their 25th Sil'ver Anniversary in April 2014.

Fall Roll
Along with concerts and gigs throughout the semester, the Sil'hooettes reserve their fall break at the University of Virginia for a tour of the East Coast called Fall Roll, visiting and performing at various colleges and groups (e.g. Tufts University Beelzebubs, Dartmouth College Aires, University of North Carolina-Chapel Hill Clef Hangers, Duke University Pitchforks) along the way.

CD
The Sil'hooettes produce a new studio album approximately every three semesters. Their most recent album, Silver Hour, produced by James Gammon, was released in November 2018.

"Homer"
Upon achieving acceptance into the Sil'hooettes, a new member is affectionately called a "Homer" and often referred to by "Homer" followed by their last name until the rest of the membership deems said member ready to shed her "Homer title". The Homer period is a rite of passage for the Sil'hooettes and is a long-standing group tradition.

Awards and honors

Musical awards

A Cappella Community Awards (ACAs)

|-
|rowspan="3"| 2011 || Virginia Sil'hooettes || Favorite Female Collegiate Group (Runner-Up) || 
|-
| "Beautiful Child" by Rufus Wainwright || Favorite Gender-Bender Song/Solo || 
|-
| "Telephone" by Lady Gaga ft. Beyoncé || Favorite Lady Gaga Cover (Runner-Up) || 
|-
|rowspan="6"| 2010 || Virginia Sil'hooettes || Favorite Female Collegiate Group || 
|-
| Take It To The Bridge || Favorite Collegiate Album || 
|-
| "Wreckless Love" by Alicia Keys || Favorite Female Vocalist—Happiness Chijioke || 
|-
| Sara Dougadir || Favorite Arranger || 
|-
| "Wreckless Love" by Alicia Keys || Favorite A Cappella Song || 
|-
| "Redemption Song" by Bob Marley || Favorite Gender-Bender Song/Solo || 

Contemporary A Cappella Recording Awards (CARAs)

|-
|rowspan="2"| 2019 || Silver Hour || Best Female Collegiate Album (Runner-Up) || 
|-
| "Make Me Feel/Kiss" by Janelle Monáe/Prince || Best Female Collegiate Arrangement—Molly Murphy (Runner-Up) || 
|-
|rowspan="5"| 2018 || From the Depths || Best Pop Album || 
|-
| From the Depths || Best Female Collegiate Album || 
|-
| "Don't Let Me Down" by The Chainsmokers || Best Female Collegiate Song || 
|-
| "Black Water Lilies" by AURORA || Best Female Collegiate Arrangement—Sarah Donnelly || 
|-
| "River" by Bishop Briggs || Best Female Collegiate Soloist—Emily Dietz || 
|-
|rowspan="4"| 2016 || Luster || Best Female Collegiate Album || 
|-
| "I Will Never Die" by Delta Rae || Best Female Collegiate Song || 
|-
| "Wait It Out" by Imogen Heap || Best Female Collegiate Arrangement—Alex Peterson || 
|-
| "I Will Never Die" by Delta Rae || Best Female Collegiate Soloist—Sophie Maus || 
|-
|rowspan="3"| 2015 || 1989 || Best Female Collegiate Album || 
|-
| "This Is What It Feels Like" by BANKS || Best Female Collegiate Song || 
|-
| "Creep" by Radiohead || Best Female Collegiate Soloist—Stephanie Lee || 
|-
|rowspan="4"| 2013 || Playing With Lightning || Best Female Collegiate Album || 
|-
| "Around Us" by Jónsi || Best Female Collegiate Song || 
|-
| "Howl" by Florence and the Machine || Best Female Collegiate Arrangement—Liz Smith || 
|-
| "Mama" by Beth Hart || Best Female Collegiate Soloist—Happiness Chijioke || 
|-
|rowspan="3"| 2011 || Blackout || Best Female Collegiate Album (Runner-Up) || 
|-
| "I See You" by Leona Lewis || Best Female Collegiate Song || 
|-
| "Beautiful Child" by Rufus Wainwright || Best Female Collegiate Arrangement—Caitlin Morton || 
|-
|rowspan="5"| 2010 || Take It To The Bridge || Best Female Collegiate Album (Runner-Up) || 
|-
| "1234 (Van She Tech Remix)" by Feist || Best Female Collegiate Song (Runner-Up) || 
|-
| "Wreckless Love" by Alicia Keys || Best Female Collegiate Soloist—Happiness Chijioke || 
|-
| "Wreckless Love" by Alicia Keys || Best Hip-Hop/R&B Song || 
|-
| Take It To The Bridge || Best Female Collegiate Album Short List || 
|-
|rowspan="5"| 2008 || Sauce || Best Female Collegiate Album || 
|-
| "Slow Me Down" by Emmy Rossum || Best Female Collegiate Arrangement—Sara Dougadir || 
|-
| "Butterflies and Hurricanes" by Muse || Best Female Collegiate Song (Runner-Up) || 
|-
| "Careful What You Wish for" by Jonatha Brooke || Best Female Collegiate Soloist—Jenna Pastuszek || 
|-
| "Dance With Me" by Lexi Witman || Best Scholastic Original || 
|-
|rowspan="3"| 2007 || To Homer and Back || Best Female Collegiate Album || 
|-
| "They" by Jem || Best Female Collegiate Song || 
|-
| "A Broken Wing" by Martina McBride || Best Female Collegiate Soloist—Anne Foster || 
|-
|rowspan="3"| 2005 || Tangled || Best Female Collegiate Album || 
|-
| "Beautiful Day" by U2 || Best Female Collegiate Arrangement—Blaire Reinhard || 
|-
| "Where Would You Be" by Martina McBride || Best Female Collegiate Soloist (Runner-Up)—Anne Foster || 
|-
|rowspan="4"| 2005 || Aftershock || Best Female Collegiate Album (Runner-Up) || 
|-
| "Wrong Impression" by Natalie Imbruglia || Best Female Collegiate Arrangement—Summerlyn Lotz || 
|-
| "Wrong Impression" by Natalie Imbruglia || Best Female Collegiate Song (Runner-Up) || 
|-
| "Two Satellites" by Mary Beth Maziarz || Best Female Collegiate Soloist (Runner-Up)—Melody Akhavan || 
|-
|rowspan="4"| 2001 || "Snow on the Sahara" by Anggun || Best Female Collegiate Song (Runner-Up) || 

Recorded A Cappella Review Board (RARB)

|-
| 2014 || "This Is What It Feels Like" by Banks || 2014 Track of the Year || 
|-
| 2014 || 1989 || 2014 Album Pick of the Year—Honorable Mention || 
|-
| 2012 || Playing With Lightning || 2012 Album Pick of the Year—Honorable Mention || 
|-
| 2009 || Take It To The Bridge || 2009 Album Pick of the Year ||

Selection for "best of" compilation albums

Best of College A Cappella (BOCA)

|-
| 2018 || "Until the Levee" by Joy Williams || BOCA 2018: Best of College A Cappella || 
|-
| 2016 || "My Gun" by Tove Lo || BOCA 2016: Best of College A Cappella || 
|-
| 2014 || "Idioteque" by Radiohead || Best of BOCA: The First 20 Years || 
|-
| 2012 || "Idioteque" by Radiohead || BOCA 2012: Best of College A Cappella || 
|-
| 2011 || "Telephone” by Lady Gaga ft. Beyoncé || BOCA 2011: Best of College A Cappella || 
|-
| 2010 || "Say (All I Need)" by OneRepublic || BOCA 2010: Best of College A Cappella || 
|-
| 2008 || "You'll Think of Me" by Keith Urban || BOCA 2008: Best of College A Cappella || 
|-
| 2005 || "Where Would You Be" by Martina McBride || BOCA 2005: Best of College A Cappella || 
|-
| 2003 || "Wrong Impression" by Natalie Imbruglia || BOCA 2003: Best of College A Cappella || 

Contemporary A Cappella Music Organization (CAMO)

|-
| 2005 || "Devils and Angels" by Toby Lightman || Top Shelf A Cappella 2005 || 

sing

|-
| 2014 || "This Is What It Feels Like" by BANKS || sing 11: One Louder || 
|-
| 2012 || "Around Us" by Jónsi || sing IX: Supernovem || 
|-
| 2009 || "Wreckless Love" by Alicia Keys" || sing VI: sunny side up || 

Voices Only

|-
| 2017 || "Black Water Lilies" by AURORA || Voices Only 2017 || 
|-
| 2016 || "Echo" by VÉRITÉ || Voices Only 2016 || 
|-
| 2015 || "This Is What It Feels Like" by BANKS || Voices Only 2015 || 
|-
| 2013 || "Starry Eyed" by Ellie Goulding || Voices Only 2013 || 
|-
| 2012 || "Around Us" by Jónsi || Voices Only 2012 || 
|-
| 2011 || "Beautiful Child" by Rufus Wainwright || Voices Only 2011 || 
|-
| 2009 || "1234 (Van She Tech Remix)" by Feist || Voices Only 2009 || 
|-
| 2008 || "Butterflies and Hurricanes" by Muse || Voices Only 2008 || 
|-
| 2006 || "Don't Cha Wanna Ride" by Joss Stone || Voices Only 2006 || 
|-
| 2005 || "When I Think About Angels" by Jamie O'Neal || Voices Only 2005 || 

Women's A Cappella Association

|-
| 2016 || "I Will Never Die" by Delta Rae || WACA Vol. 3 || 
|-
| 2015 || "This Is What It Feels Like" by BANKS || WACA Vol. 2 || 
|-

A cappella competitions
International Championship of Collegiate A Cappella (ICCAs)

|-
|rowspan="2"| 2003 || Virginia Sil'hooettes || ICCA Semi-Finals—3rd Place || 
|-
| Virginia Sil'hooettes || ICCA Regionals—1st Place ||

Discography
 Silver Hour (2018)
 From The Depths (2017)
 Luster (2015)
 1989 (2014)
 Playing with Lightning (2012)
 Blackout (2010)
 Take It To The Bridge (2009)
 Sauce (2008)
 To Homer and Back (2006)
 Tangled (2004)
 Aftershock (2002)
 Flair (2001)
 Delirious (1999)
 Shades of Silver (1998)

Notable alumni
 Blaire Reinhard - musician, the Blaire Reinhard Band

References

External links
 Official Sil'hooettes website

Collegiate a cappella groups
Musical groups established in 1988
University of Virginia musical groups
1988 establishments in Virginia
Women in Virginia